Vivaan Shah (born 11 January 1990) is an Indian actor who appears in Hindi films. He made his film debut with Saat Khoon Maaf (2011) as Arun Kumar. Thereafter, he signed a three-film deal with director Vishal Bhardwaj. In 2014, he was given a role in Farah Khan's film Happy New Year.

Personal life
Shah is the younger son of actors Naseeruddin Shah and Ratna Pathak. He is the nephew of Lt. Gen. Zameer Uddin Shah, the former vice-chancellor of Aligarh Muslim University. He is the brother of Imaad Shah and his paternal half sister is Heeba Shah.

Shah graduated from The Doon School in 2009.

Filmography

Television

References

External links
 
 

Living people
21st-century Indian male actors
Indian male film actors
Male actors in Hindi cinema
1990 births
Male actors from Mumbai
The Doon School alumni